Barry Lyons may refer to:

Barry Lyons (baseball) (born 1960), former Major League Baseball catcher
Barry Lyons (footballer) (born 1945), English former footballer and manager
Barry Lyons, musician in Trees (band)